Joseph Carr (1879–1939) was the U.S. National Football League president, 1921–1939.

Joseph or Joe Carr may also refer to:  
 Joseph Carr (music publisher) (1739–1819), 19th century Baltimore music publisher
 Joe Carr (1922–2004), Irish amateur golfer
 Joe Carr (Ghanaian footballer), former Ghanaian international goalkeeper
 Joe Carr (Texas musician) (1951–2014), American roots and country musician and author
 Joe C. Carr (1907–1981), Tennessee politician, Tennessee Secretary of State, 1941–1944, 1945–1949, and 1957–1977
 Joe S. Carr, member of the Tennessee House of Representatives
 Joe "Fingers" Carr, stage name used by piano player Lou Busch
 J. Comyns Carr (1849–1916), English drama and art critic
 J. L. Carr (1912–1994), English novelist
 Joe Carr (English footballer) (1919–1940), English footballer
 Joe Carr (Scottish footballer) (1931–2015), Scottish footballer
 Joseph Milton Carr (1858–1929), merchant and politician in Ontario, Canada
 Joseph Bradford Carr (1828–1895), U.S. soldier and politician, New York Secretary of State, 1879–1885